Xavier Tyler Jerome Munford (born June 1, 1992) is an American professional basketball player for Hapoel Tel Aviv of the Israeli Basketball Premier League and the Eurocup. He played two seasons of college basketball for the Rhode Island Rams.

High school career
Munford attended Saint Benedict's Preparatory School in Newark, New Jersey. As a senior in 2009–10, he helped the Grey Bees to a 26–1 record and the No. 2 national ranking, while averaging 12 points per game.

College career
As a freshman at Miami Dade College in 2010–11, Munford averaged 17.3 points, 2.8 rebounds, 2.4 assists and 1.5 steals in 32 games. He was subsequently named the FCSAA's Newcomer of the Year and was a First Team All-NJCAA Region 8 selection.

In 2011, Munford transferred to Iowa Western Community College, where as a sophomore in 2011–12, he averaged 16.6 points per game for the Reivers, leading the Iowa Community College Athletic Conference (ICCAC). He helped guide Iowa Western to a 24–9 record en route to the NJCAA Region 11 finals, and was a 2011–12 NJCAA Division I All-American selection.

Following the 2011–12 season, Munford signed a National Letter of Intent to play college basketball for the University of Rhode Island.

As a junior playing for the Rhode Island Rams in 2012–13, Munford was named to the USBWA All-District I team. In 29 games, he averaged 17.4 points (ranked third in the Atlantic 10 Conference), 2.8 rebounds, 1.9 assists and 1.0 steals in 35.4 minutes per game.

As a senior in 2013–14, Munford became the fastest player in school history to reach the 1,000-point plateau, getting there in his final home game for the Rams against Fordham. In 32 games, he averaged 16.9 points, 4.0 rebounds, 2.4 assists and 1.1 steals in 35.6 minutes per game.

Professional career

Bakersfield Jam (2014–2016)
Munford went undrafted in the 2014 NBA Draft. On November 1, 2014, Munford was selected by the Maine Red Claws in the third round of the 2014 NBA Development League Draft. He was later traded to the Bakersfield Jam on draft night. On November 14, he made his professional debut in a 127–125 loss to the Texas Legends, recording seven points, two rebounds, two assists and one steal in 10 minutes. He appeared in 51 games for Bakersfield in 2014–15, averaging 11.5 points, 3.4 rebounds, 2.8 assists and 1.0 steals per game.

Los Angeles Lakers (2015)
In July 2015, Munford joined the Los Angeles Lakers for the 2015 NBA Summer League. On November 2, he returned to the Jam. On January 29, 2016, he was named in the West All-Star team for the 2016 NBA D-League All-Star Game. In 42 games for the Jam in 2015–16, he averaged 20.5 points, 4.1 rebounds, 6.4 assists and 1.0 steals per game.

Memphis Grizzlies (2016)
On March 16, 2016, Munford signed a 10-day contract with the Memphis Grizzlies to help the team deal with numerous injuries. Memphis had to use an NBA hardship exemption in order to sign him as he made their roster stand at 18, three over the allowed limited of 15. The next day, he made his NBA debut in a 96–86 loss to the Milwaukee Bucks, recording two points, one rebound and two steals in 11 minutes off the bench. On March 27, he signed a second 10-day contract with the Grizzlies. On April 1, he had a 12-point game against the Toronto Raptors. On April 7, he signed a multi-year contract with the Grizzlies. On June 25, 2016, the Grizzlies parted ways with Munford after they declined to exercise their team option on his contract for the 2016–17 season.

Greensboro Swarm (2016–2017)
In July 2016, Munford re-joined the Los Angeles Lakers for the 2016 NBA Summer League. On September 26, 2016, he signed with the Los Angeles Clippers, but was later waived on October 12 after appearing in two preseason games. On November 12, he was acquired by the Greensboro Swarm of the NBA Development League.

Barcelona Lassa (2017)
On February 3, 2017, Munford signed with FC Barcelona Lassa until the end of the season due to the injury problems of the Spanish team. On June 8, 2017, Barcelona announced the end of their contract with Munford.

Wisconsin Herd (2017–2018)
Munford appeared in two games during the 2017 NBA Summer League for the Golden State Warriors.

On October 5, 2017, Munford signed with the Milwaukee Bucks. Seven days later, he was waived by the Bucks. On October 15, 2017, the Greensboro Swarm traded Munford and a 2018 second-round pick to the Bucks affiliate Wisconsin Herd for their 2017 and 2018 first-round selections.

Milwaukee Bucks (2018)
On January 7, 2018, Munford signed a two-way contract with the Milwaukee Bucks, meaning throughout the rest of the season that year, he'd split his playing time between the Bucks and the affiliate Herd. The move also resulted in the Bucks converting Sean Kilpatrick to a regular season contract, as well as waiving Joel Bolomboy from the Bucks after previously promoting him to a regular season contract as well.

Fujian Sturgeons (2018)
On December 23, 2018, Munford was reported to have signed with Fujian Sturgeons, and made his debut on the same day with a double-double, scoring 28 points, ten rebounds, five assists and a block in a 106–95 win over the Shanghai Sharks, but was later reported to be replaced by Eugene Jeter after five days.

Return to Wisconsin Herd (2019)
On January 28, 2019, the Wisconsin Herd announced that they had signed Munford.

Delaware Blue Coats (2019–2020)
On October 26, 2019, Munford was named to the training camp roster of the Delaware Blue Coats of the NBA G League. Munford scored 34 points and had seven rebounds, four assists and one steal in a win against the Erie BayHawks on January 25, 2020. On March 4, Munford posted 36 points, six rebounds, four assists and two steals in a 124–108 loss to the Long Island Nets. During the 2019–20 season, Munford averaged 17.9 points, 5.3 rebounds, 5.6 assists and 1.0 steal per game.

Bursaspor (2020–2021)
On August 2, 2020, Munford signed with Frutti Extra Bursaspor of the Turkish Super League (BSL).

South East Melbourne Phoenix (2021–2022)
On September 1, 2021, Munford signed with the South East Melbourne Phoenix in Australia for the 2021–22 NBL season.

Hapoel Tel Aviv (2022–present)
On July 18, 2022, Munford signed with Hapoel Tel Aviv of the Israeli Basketball Premier League.

National team career
Munford played with the senior United States national team at the 2017 FIBA AmeriCup, where he won a gold medal.

NBA career statistics

Regular season

|-
| style="text-align:left;"| 
| style="text-align:left;"| Memphis
| 14 || 0 || 17.4 || .416 || .391 || .500 || 2.2 || 1.6 || .9 || .2 || 5.7
|-
| style="text-align:left;"| 
| style="text-align:left;"| Milwaukee
| 6 || 0 || 3.5 || .167 || .000 || .500 || .2 || .7 || .2 || .0 || .5
|- class="sortbottom"
| style="text-align:center;" colspan="2"| Career
| 20 || 0 || 13.3 || .398 || .360 || .500 || 1.6 || 1.3 || .7 || .2 || 4.2

Playoffs

|-
| style="text-align:left;"| 2016
| style="text-align:left;"| Memphis
| 4 || 0 || 22.3 || .321 || .125 || .000 || 2.3 || 2.5 || 1.5 || .8 || 4.8
|- class="sortbottom"
| style="text-align:center;" colspan="2"| Career
| 4 || 0 || 22.3 || .321 || .125 || .000 || 2.3 || 2.5 || 1.5 || .8 || 4.8

Career statistics

Domestic leagues

Personal life
Munford is the son of Zamora and Darren Munford, and has a younger brother, Elijah.

References

External links

NBA.com profile
NBA D-League profile
Rhode Island Rams bio

1992 births
Living people
American expatriate basketball people in Australia
American expatriate basketball people in China
American expatriate basketball people in Spain
American expatriate basketball people in Turkey
American men's basketball players
Bakersfield Jam players
Basketball players from New Jersey
Bursaspor Basketbol players
Delaware Blue Coats players
FC Barcelona Bàsquet players
Fujian Sturgeons players
Greensboro Swarm players
Hapoel Tel Aviv B.C. players
Iowa Western Reivers men's basketball players
Liga ACB players
Memphis Grizzlies players
Miami Dade Sharks men's basketball players
Milwaukee Bucks players
People from Hillside, New Jersey
Point guards
Rhode Island Rams men's basketball players
St. Benedict's Preparatory School alumni
Sportspeople from Union County, New Jersey
South East Melbourne Phoenix players
Undrafted National Basketball Association players
United States men's national basketball team players
Wisconsin Herd players